Uruá River is a river of Amazonas state in north-western Brazil. 
The river is located between the Negro River and the Amazon River. The river has been tested for populations of giant otter.

See also
List of rivers of Amazonas

References
Brazilian Ministry of Transport

Rivers of Amazonas (Brazilian state)